San Ġwann Football Club is a Maltese football club from the urban town of San Ġwann, which currently plays in the Maltese Challenge League.

History
The club was founded in 1949 as St. John F.C. when San Ġwann was known as Imsierah but later became known as San Ġwann F.C. The area in San Ġwann where the club is found is known as Tal-Gharghar. The team's colors are yellow and blue. San Ġwann footballers are known as the Saints.

Players

Current squad

References

External links

Football clubs in Malta
Association football clubs established in 1972
1972 establishments in Malta